MA3 or Ma3 or MA-3 may refer to:

 Massachusetts Route 3
U.S. Route 3 in Massachusetts
 The abbreviation for 
 Ménage à 3 (webcomic), a webcomic published since 2008
 Mercury-Atlas 3, a test flight of Project Mercury